I-174 may refer to:

 Interstate 174, a connection highway in North Myrtle Beach, South Carolina
 Japanese submarine I-174, a Kaidai class submarine operated by the Imperial Japanese Navy